Duke of Arión is an hereditary title in the Peerage of Spain accompanied by the dignity of Grandee, granted in 1725 by Philip V to Baltasar de Zúñiga, viceroy of New Spain.

The title makes reference to the town of Casasola de Arión, in the Province of Valladolid.

Dukes of Arión (1725)

 Baltasar de Zúñiga, 1st Duke of Arión (1658-1727)
 Manuela de Zúñiga y Guzmán, 2nd Duchess of Arión (b. 1640), eldest daughter of Juan Manuel de Zúñiga-Sotomayor y Mendoza, father of the 1st Duke
 Ignacio Pimentel y Borja, 3rd Duke of Arión (1706-1763), eldest son of Antonio Pimentel y Zúñiga, eldest son of the 2nd Duchess
 Martín Fernández de Velasco, 4th Duke of Arión (1729-1776), eldest son of Manuela Pimentel y Zúñiga, eldest daughter of the 2nd Duchess
 María Teresa Pacheco y Fernández de Velasco, 5th Duchess of Arión (1765-1828), eldest daughter of María de la Portería Fernández de Velasco, granddaughter of the 2nd Duchess
 Joaquín Fernández de Córdoba y Pacheco, 6th Duke of Arión (1787-1871), eldest son of the 5th Duchess
 Fernando Fernández de Córdoba y Álvarez de las Asturias Bohorques, 7th Duke of Arión (1845-1891), eldest son of the 10th Marquess of Povar, eldest son of the 6th Duke
 Joaquín Fernández de Córdoba y Osma, 8th Duke of Arión (1870-1957), eldest son of the 7th Duke
 Gonzalo Fernández de Córdoba y Larios, 9th Duke of Arión (1934-2013), only son of the 13th Marquess of Pomar, eldest son of the 8th Duke
 Joaquín Fernández de Córdoba y Hohenlohe-Langenburg, 10th Duke of Arión (b. 1961), eldest son of the 9th Duke

See also
List of dukes in the peerage of Spain
List of current Grandees of Spain

References

Bibliography
 

Dukedoms of Spain
Grandees of Spain
Lists of dukes
Lists of Spanish nobility
Noble titles created in 1725